Donald Cameron Watt (17 May 1928 – 30 October 2014) was a British historian.

Early life
Donald Cameron Watt was a chorister in the Choir of King's College, Cambridge, and then was educated at Rugby School. He read Philosophy, Politics and Economics at Oriel College, Oxford, graduating from Oxford University with a bachelor's degree in 1951.

Career
Watt served as a Professor of International History at the London School of Economics, where he served as the Head of the Department and Stevenson Chair of International History from 1981 to 1993.

Watt edited Survey of International Affairs at Chatham House from 1962 to 1971. He was the author or co-author of 25 books. He won the Wolfson History Prize in 1990.

Personal life and death
Watt was married twice. He first married Marianne Grau in 1951, and they had a son. After she died in 1962, he married Felicia Stanley. She predeceased him in 1997.

Watt died on 30 October 2014. He was 86 years old.

Works

References

1928 births
2014 deaths
People educated at Rugby School
Alumni of Oriel College, Oxford
20th-century English historians
Academics of the London School of Economics